Valhalla High School may refer to:

 Valhalla High School (California), located in El Cajon, California
 Valhalla High School (New York), located in Valhalla, New York